The Avro Canada CF-100 Canuck (affectionately known as the "Clunk") is a Canadian twinjet interceptor/fighter designed and produced by aircraft manufacturer Avro Canada. It has the distinction of being the only Canadian-designed fighter to enter mass production.

Work commenced during October 1946 in response to a Royal Canadian Air Force (RCAF) specification calling for a new jet-powered interceptor/fighter aircraft suitable for long-distance patrol missions and all-weather operations. On 19 January 1950, the CF-100 Mark 1 prototype, 18101, conducted its maiden flight, powered by a pair of Rolls-Royce Avon RA 3 turbojet engines. Both pre-production and production series aircraft were powered by the domestically-developed Avro Orenda engine instead. Flight testing proved the CF-100 to possess a relatively short takeoff run and a high climb rate, making it well suited to its role as an interceptor.

The CF-100 principally served with the Royal Canadian Air Force and Canadian Armed Forces; it was also procured in small numbers by Belgium to equip the Belgian Air Component. Introduced during 1952 amid the Cold War, the CF-100 was typically deployed at both NATO bases in Europe and in North America as part of North American Aerospace Defense Command (NORAD). In addition to the type's use by frontline squadrons, it was also supplied to operational training units and frequently used for other secondary duties, including aerial reconnaissance and electronic warfare roles. During the early 1950s, the Avro Canada CF-103, an advanced derivative of the CF-100 that adopted a swept wing and was capable of transonic speeds, was in development, but was terminated. Further development of these concepts ultimately led to the Avro Canada CF-105 Arrow.

During 1981, all of the remaining RCAF CF-100s were withdrawn from service, having been succeeded in the electronic warfare role by the CC-117 Falcon.

Design and development

Background
Amid the final years of the Second World War, officials in Canada had concluded both that the development of a self-sufficient indigenous military aviation industry would be of considerable national value and that the new field of jet propulsion held considerable promise. As early as July 1944, Canada had commenced work on its own turbojet engine programme, producing the experimental Avro Canada Chinook powerplant. During the late 1940s and early 1950s, events such as the Korean War and Soviet atomic bomb project had contributed to the rising international tensions of what would become known as the Cold War; the Canadian Government decided to respond by greatly increasing defense expenditure. The Royal Canadian Air Force (RCAF) was a major recipient of the expanded budget, reaching 46.6% of overall defense expenditure during FY 1951-1952, some of which is attributable to several major procurement programmes that were conducted.

During this period, the RCAF had a strong interest in acquiring its own fleet of jet-powered combat aircraft. Specifically, the service had identified a need for a new jet-powered interceptor/fighter aircraft that would be able to patrol the vast areas of Canada's north and operate in all weather conditions. Envisaged as a two-seat fighter, to be crewed by a pilot and navigator, it would adopt two powerful engines along with a relatively advanced radar set and fire control system housed in its nose that would enable the aircraft to be operated in all-weather or night conditions. These requirements were formalized by a RCAF specification that was issued during 1946. According to RCAF Air Marshal Wilfred Curtis, there was no existing aircraft that could satisfy the specification, nor was there any suitable aircraft already in development elsewhere, thus it was deemed necessary for Canada to develop such a fighter itself.

On 3 November 1945, an agreement was struck to develop a prototype jet-powered fighter on behalf of the RCAF; on 13 October 1946, the issuing of government contracts to aircraft manufacturer Avro Canada enabled the company to commence the associated design work. Out of this effort would emerge the XC-100, a prototype all-weather fighter, which was developed to meet the outstanding specification. Work was initially overseen by Edgar Atkin, Avro Canada's Chief Engineer; a key contributor to the programme was ex-de Havilland aircraft designer John Frost, who was appointed chief design engineer for military projects and thus responsible for the CF-100's development. At one stage Frost, along with Avro's Chief Aerodynamacist Jim Chamberlin, extensively reworked the original design of the fuselage. On 17 May 1949, in response to the programme's progress, an additional agreement was reached to produce ten pre-production fighters along with 30 Avro Orendas, an indigenously-developed turbojet engine.

Flight testing
The CF-100 Mark 1 prototype, 18101, emerged from the factory, painted gloss black overall with white lightning bolts running down the fuselage and engines. On 19 January 1950, the CF-100 prototype flew its maiden flight with Gloster Aircraft Company Chief Test Pilot Squadron Leader Bill Waterton (on loan from Gloster, then also part of the Hawker Siddeley group) at the controls. The Mark 1 was powered by a pair of Rolls-Royce Avon RA 3 turbojet engines, each capable of generating a maximum thrust of 28.9 kN (2,950 kgp / 6,500 lbf) thrust. During July 1950, the second prototype, 18102, performed its first flight. On 5 April 1951, the second prototype was lost in an accident that killed test pilot Bruce Warren. According to aviation author James Dow, this loss resulted in the programme being placed on indefinite hold and questions raised over Avro Canada's competency.

In response to the loss and issues encountered, Avro Canada dismissed several members of the design team and established a special working group to rectify a major structural design error identified. To address the latter, a straightforward modification was developed that could be easily retrofitted into the pre-production aircraft. While both prototypes had been powered by Avon engines, the subsequent pre-production and production series aircraft used the locally developed Orenda powerplant instead, the first of which flying during June 1951. As a result of delays encountered in the development of the Orenda, its selection unavoidably impacted the CF-100 programme's timetable as well. Dissatisfied with the pace of development, Cabinet Minister C. D. Howe informed Avro to suspend work on all other projects and focus its efforts on completing the CF-100.

Five pre-production Mk 2 test aircraft (serial numbers 18103-18107) were produced, all fitted with Orenda 2 engines; one was fitted with dual controls and designated a Mk 2T trainer. According to pilot Jacqueline Cochran, the Orenda engine responded noticeably smoother than any of the British or American-built jet engines that she had previously flown. Initial teething issues with the pre-production aircraft were soon resolved. The first production version, designated Mk 3, made its first flight during October 1952. The Mk 3 incorporated the APG-33 radar and was armed with eight .50 caliber Browning M3 machine guns. The Mk 3CT and Mk 3DT were again dual control versions supplied to operational training units.

During mid-January 1955, a CF-100 arrived at Eglin AFB, Florida, for cold-weather tests in the climatic hangar. A seven-man RCAF team, headed by Flight Lieutenant B. D. Darling, which had previously conducted tests at Namao Air Base, Alberta, were part of the climatic detachment of Central Experimental and Proving Establishment; testing commenced during the following month. In March 1956, a batch of four CF-100 Canucks were dispatched to Eglin AFB to conduct comparative armament trials, where the type was flown by several United States Air Force (USAF) crews. The operational suitability tests, dubbed Project Banana Belt, were carried out by the 3241st Test Group (Interceptor) of the APGC's Air Force Operational Test Center, in conjunction with a project team belonging to the RCAF.

Production
During September 1950, the RCAF placed an initial production order for 124 Mk 3 aircraft, the first of which entering service in 1953. This model was armed with eight .50 caliber machine guns. The definitive rocket-armed Mk 4A  was based on the prototype Mk 4 (a modified Mk 3), which first flew on 11 October 1952. The nose housed the much larger APG-40 radar, while the wings were equipped with wingtip pods, each containing up to 29 Mk 4/Mk 40 "Mighty Mouse" folding-fin aerial rocket, to be used in addition to the guns. During 1954, the last 54 of an order for the Mk 3 were swapped for the more advanced Mk 4, the total orders for the Mk 4 rose to 510. The Mk 4B version was furnished with more powerful Orenda 11s.

Five versions, or marks, were produced. The high-altitude Mk 5 was the final variant, production of which commenced during 1955. This model featured a -longer wingtip and enlarged tailplane, along with removal of the machine guns. The proposed Mk 6 was to have mounted Sparrow II missiles and been powered by afterburning Orenda 11IR engines; this was intended to be adopted as an "interim" fighter prior to the introduction of the more advanced Avro Canada CF-105 Arrow, which was then under development. An advanced derivative of the CF-100 was the CF-103, which was equipped with a swept wing and projected to be capable of transonic speeds; this was built in mock-up form during 1951, but was considered obsolete even before the CF-100's demonstrated ability to exceed the speed of sound in a dive.

Operational history

Amongst RCAF pilots, the Canuck was affectionately known as the "Clunk", the name has been attributed to the noise produced by the forward landing gear during retraction into its well after takeoff. Another common, less attractive, nickname was the "Lead Sled", a reference to its heavy controls and general lack of maneuverability, a nickname that was shared with a number of other 1950s aircraft. Others included CF-Zero, the Zilch, and the Beast, all references to an aircraft many pilots considered less glamorous than RCAF day fighters like the Canadair Sabre.

Operationally, many CF-100s functioned under the US–Canadian North American Air Defense Command (NORAD), which protected North American airspace from Soviet intruders, particularly the threat posed by nuclear-armed bombers. Additionally, between 1956 and 1962, as part of the North Atlantic Treaty Organization (NATO), four CF-100 squadrons were based in Europe with 1 Air Division; for some time, the CF-100 was the only NATO fighter that was capable of operating in zero visibility and poor weather conditions.

Around the start of the Korean War in the early 1950s, the United States Air Force (USAF) found itself in urgent need of a jet-propelled, all-weather, interdiction/surveillance aircraft. This urgency was so great that the USAF was willing to consider two foreign designs: the CF-100 and the English Electric Canberra. Following an evaluation, the CF-100 was rejected due to its insufficient range and payload capabilities; the rival English Electric design was selected and developed into the Martin B-57 Canberra.

At its peak, the CF-100 served with nine RCAF squadrons in the mid-1950s. Four of these squadrons were deployed to Europe under the NIMBLE BAT ferry program, replacing multiple NATO RCAF squadrons equipped with Canadair Sabre day fighters to provide all-weather defense against Soviet intruders. While flown in the North American theatre, the CF-100 would typically retain a natural metal finish; however, those flying overseas were given a British-style disruptive camouflage scheme: dark sea gray and green on top, light sea gray on the bottom.

During his Avro Canada years, the Chief Development Pilot, S/L Żurakowski, continued to fly as an aerobatic display pilot, with spectacular results, especially at the 1955 Farnborough Airshow where he displayed the CF-100 in a "falling-leaf." He was acclaimed again as the "Great Żura" by many aviation and industry observers who could not believe a large, all-weather fighter could be put through its paces so spectacularly. His performance has been credited with Belgium's decision to purchase the CF-100 for the Belgian Air Force. Additional efforts were made to sell the Canuck to several other nations, including the United States, but no other export customers for the type would be secured. Dow reasoned that the Canuck's poor overseas sales performance caused officials to have little confidence for exporting other aircraft, including the CF-105 Arrow.

During the type's production life, 692 CF-100s of different variants were manufactured, including the 53 aircraft that were delivered to the Belgian Air Force. Although originally designed for only 2,000 flight hours, it was found that the Canuck's airframe could serve for over 20,000 hours before needing to be withdrawn. The Belgian aircraft were either scrapped after storage or written off in crashes. Consequently, though the Canadian CF-100 would be replaced in its front line role by the faster CF-101 Voodoo, the Canuck continued to serve with 414 Squadron of the Canadian Forces, based at CFB North Bay, Ontario; during its later years, the type was tasked with aerial reconnaissance, training and electronic warfare missions. It was finally withdrawn from service during 1981. After the CF-100 was retired, a number of aircraft still remain across Canada (and elsewhere) as static displays.

During the late 1950s, an advanced supersonic interceptor, CF-105 Arrow along with the sophisticated Orenda Iroquois engine, was under development by Avro Canada as an intended successor to the CF-100. However, during 1959, work on the CF-105 was terminated following a controversial decision by the Canadian government.

Variants
 CF-100 Mk 1 : The first two prototypes.
 CF-100 Mk 1P : Proposed photo-reconnaissance version. Not built.
 CF-100 Mk 2 : Ten pre-production aircraft.
 CF-100 Mk 2T : Dual control training version of the CF-100 Mk 2. Two built.
 CF-100 Mk 3 : Two-seat all-weather long-range interceptor fighter aircraft. First production version for the RCAF.  Eight .5-inch Browning M3 guns (200 rounds per gun) in a forward firing ventral gun pack.  70 built.
 CF-100 Mk 3A : CF-100 Mk 3 sub-type, powered by two Orenda 2 turbojet engines. 21 built.
 CF-100 Mk 3B : CF-100 Mk 3 sub-type, powered by two Orenda 8 turbojet engines. 45 built.
 CF-100 Mk 3CT : One CF-100 Mk 3 converted into a dual control training aircraft. Later redesignated CF-100 Mk 3D.
 CF-100 Mk 4 : Two-seat all-weather long-range interceptor fighter aircraft. Eight .5-inch Browning M3 guns (200 rounds per gun) in a forward firing ventral gun pack.  Plus two wingtip pods of 29 x 70-mm (2.75 in) "Mighty Mouse" fin-folding aerial rockets.  One pre-production aircraft. 

 CF-100 Mk 4A : CF-100 Mk 4 sub-type, powered by two Orenda 9 turbojet engines. 137 built.
 CF-100 Mk 4B : CF-100 Mk 4 sub-type, powered by two Orenda 11 turbojet engines. 141 built.
 CF-100 Mk 4X : Proposed version of the CF-100 Mk 4. Not built.
 CF-100 Mk 5 : Two-seat all-weather long-range interceptor fighter aircraft, powered by two Orenda 11 or Orenda 14 turbojet engines.  Two wingtip pods of 29 x 70-mm (2.75 in) "Mighty Mouse" fin-folding aerial rockets.  332 built.
 CF-100 Mk 5D : Small number of CF-100 Mk 5s converted into ECM (Electronic Countermeasures), EW (Electronic Warfare) aircraft.
 CF-100 Mk 5M : Small number of CF-100 Mk 5s equipped to carry the AIM-7 Sparrow II air-to-air missiles.
 CF-100 Mk 6 : Proposed version armed with the AIM-7 Sparrow II air-to-air missile. Not built.

Operators

 Belgian Air Force (53 Mk 5s from 1957 to 1964)
 11 Squadron
 349 Squadron
 350 Squadron

 Royal Canadian Air Force
 Canadian Forces Air Command 
 409 Squadron
 410 Squadron
 414 Squadron
 416 Squadron
 419 Squadron
 423 Squadron
 425 Squadron
 428 Squadron
 432 Squadron
 433 Squadron
 440 Squadron
 445 Squadron
 448 Squadron

Notable accidents and incidents 
 11 August 1953: a CF-100 crashed in Longueuil, Québec shortly after take-off, killing both crewmen. Two houses were struck, killing seven on the ground including five children - all six years old and younger.
 15 May 1956: A CF-100 crashed into the Villa St. Louis at Orléans, Ontario, killing both crewmen and 13 civilians on the ground in what is known as the Convent Crash.
 25 August 1958: Two CF-100s in a four-aircraft formation collided and crashed at No. 2 (F) Wing, Grostenquin, France. One aircraft crashed into the base hospital and one crashed into a field. Two people were killed in the hospital and three aircrew were killed.

Aircraft on display

Belgium
 18534 – CF-100 Mk.5 on static display at the Royal Museum of the Armed Forces and of Military History in Brussels.

Canada
 18104 – CF-100 on static display at Canadian Forces Leadership and Recruit School in Saint-Jean-sur-Richelieu, Quebec.
 18106 – CF-100 Mk.2 on static display at the Memorial Military Museum in Campbellford, Ontario.
 18126 – CF-100 Mk.3D on static display at The Hangar Flight Museum in Calgary, Alberta.
 18138 – CF-100 Mk.3B on static display at the Canadian Museum of Flight in Langley, British Columbia.
 18152 – CF-100 Mk.3 on static display at the Bomber Command Museum of Canada in Nanton, Alberta.
 18488 – CF-100 Mk.5 on static display in Centennial Park in Moncton, New Brunswick.
 18500 – CF-100 Mk.5D on static display at CFB North Bay in North Bay, Ontario.
 18506 – CF-100 Mk.4B in storage at the Canadian Air, Land, and Sea Museum in Toronto, Ontario. It was previously on display at the RCAFA 447 Wing at Hamilton International Airport, Mount Hope, Ontario.
 18602 – CF-100 on static display at Haliburton Highlands High School in Haliburton, Ontario.
 18619 – CF-100 Mk.5 on static display at Paul Coffey Park in Malton, Ontario.
 18626 – CF-100 Mk.5M on static display at Lee Park in North Bay, Ontario.
 18731 – CF-100 Mk.5 on static display at the Royal Military College of Canada in Kingston, Ontario.
 18746 – CF-100 Mk.5 on static display at the Royal Military College Saint-Jean in Saint-Jean-sur-Richelieu, Quebec.
 18759 – CF-100 on static display at the Reynolds-Alberta Museum in Wetaskiwin, Alberta.
 18761 – CF-100 on static display at CFB Cold Lake in Cold Lake, Alberta.
 18774 – CF-100 Mk.5 on static display at the National Air Force Museum of Canada in Trenton, Ontario.
 18784 – CF-100 on static display at Air Force Heritage Park at CFB Winnipeg in Winnipeg, Manitoba.
 100472 – CF-100 on static display at the Air Defence Museum at CFB Bagotville in Saguenay, Quebec.
 100476 – CF-100 Mk.4B on static display at the Alberta Aviation Museum in Edmonton, Alberta.
 100493 – CF-100 Mk.5D on ground display at the Base Borden Military Museum at CFB Borden near Barrie, Ontario.
 100747 – CF-100 Mk.5 on static display at the Atlantic Canada Aviation Museum in Halifax, Nova Scotia.
 100757 – CF-100 Mk.5D on static display at the Canada Aviation and Space Museum in Ottawa, Ontario.
 100760 – CF-100 Mk.5 in storage at the Canadian War Museum in Ottawa, Ontario. It was previously on display at CFB St. Hubert in Saint-Hubert, Quebec.
 100785 – CF-100 Mk.5D on static display at the Canadian Warplane Heritage Museum in Mount Hope, Ontario.
 100790 – CF-100 on static display at the Comox Air Force Museum in Comox, British Columbia.

United Kingdom
 18393 – CF-100 Mk.4B on static display at the Imperial War Museum Duxford in Duxford, Cambridgeshire.

United States
 100779 – CF-100 Mk.5C on static display at the Peterson Air and Space Museum at Peterson Air Force Base near Colorado Springs, Colorado.
 18241 – CF-100 Mk.4A on static display at the National Museum of the United States Air Force at Wright-Patterson AFB in Dayton, Ohio. It is painted in 428 Sqn colours.
 100504 – CF-100 Mk.5 on static display at the Castle Air Museum at the former Castle AFB in Atwater, California.

Specifications (CF-100 Mk 5)

See also

 Aerospace Heritage Foundation of Canada
 Avro Canada CF-105 Arrow - the design intended to replace the CF-100

References

Citations

Bibliography
 Baglow, Bob. Canucks Unlimited: Royal Canadian Air Force CF-100 Squadrons and Aircraft, 1952–1963. Ottawa, Ontario, Canada: Canuck Publications 1985. .
 Dow, James. The Arrow. James Lorimer & Company, 1997. . 
 
 Lyzun, Jim. CF-100 Canuck. Ottawa, Ontario, Canada: SMS Publishing, 1985. .
 Milberry, Larry. The Avro CF-100. Toronto, Ontario, Canada: CANAV Books, 1981. .
 Milberry, Larry. Sixty Years, The RCAF and CF Air Command 1924–1984. CANAV Books, 1984. .
 Page, Ron. Canuck: CF-100 All Weather Fighter. Erin, Ontario, Canada: Boston Mills Press, 1981. .
 Taylor, John W. R. and Jean Alexander.Combat Aircraft of the World. New York: G.P. Putnam's Sons, 1969. .
 Whitcomb, Randall L. Cold War Tech War:  The Politics of America's Air Defense. Burlington, Ontario, Canada: Apogee Books, 2008. .

External links 

 Avroland Article
 Canadian Warplane Heritage Museum Article
 Specifications
 Video from 1956 about the Canuck

CF-100
1950s Canadian fighter aircraft
Cruciform tail aircraft
Twinjets
Low-wing aircraft
Aircraft first flown in 1950